Alexandra Cunningham (born 1972/73) is an American playwright, screenwriter, and television producer.

Biography
From 1998 through 2000, she attended the Lila Acheson Wallace American Playwrights Program at The Juilliard School.

Her plays include The Theory of Three and No. 11 (Blue and White).

Cunningham is most known as a writer and producer for ABC Studios' dramedy Desperate Housewives (2004-2010), having written more episodes of the show than any other writer besides showrunner Marc Cherry. Prior to Desperate Housewives, Cunningham produced and wrote for the action series Fastlane (2002-2003), and wrote episodes of NYPD Blue (2001), Pasadena (2002), and Rome (2005). She was a developer, executive producer, and writer for the U.S. version of Prime Suspect. She was also a writer for several episodes of Chance (2016-2017), starring Hugh Laurie as neuropsychiatrist Dr. Chance, which aired on Hulu for two seasons. Most recently, she created and executive produces the Bravo series Dirty John, based on the podcast of the same name by Christopher Goffard. Starring Connie Britton and Eric Bana, it premiered on November 25, 2018.

References

External links
 

1970s births
Living people
21st-century American dramatists and playwrights
American soap opera writers
American television producers
American women television producers
Juilliard School alumni
Soap opera producers
American women screenwriters
American women television writers
American women dramatists and playwrights
Women soap opera writers
21st-century American women writers
21st-century American screenwriters